Podaa Podi is the soundtrack album for 2012 Tamil film of the same name starring Silambarasan.

Development 
The soundtrack album and background score for Podaa Podi is composed by Dharan Kumar. In April 2010, Dharan stated that the soundtrack album would consist of six tracks, further adding that the film's lead actor Silambarasan had sung two songs and that composer-singer Yuvan Shankar Raja would also sing one of the songs. The album finally features eight tracks, including an instrumental, while Silambarasan has sung three songs, of which two were penned by him; a song by Yuvan Shankar Raja was not featured. The title track had been sung by Benny Dayal and actress-singer Andrea Jeremiah. Besides Silambarasan, director Vignesh Shivan had penned the lyrics for four songs, while Na. Muthukumar and Vaali had written each one song.

Release
The audio rights were acquired by Sony Music India. A rough version of the track "Love Pannlama Venama" was leaked on the Internet in 2009 and went viral. An official complete version of the track was re-released on 6 September 2012, as a single at Suryan FM Radio Station in Chennai, with Silambarasan, Varalaxmi Sarathkumar, Dharan and Vignesh Shivan attending the event, and was made available for direct download, a month prior to the official audio release for promotional purpose. The entire album was released direct to stores on 10 October 2012.

Track listing

Reception
The album received positive response from critics as well as audiences. Behindwoods gave the album a rating of 3.5 out of 5 stating "The music perfectly complements the fact that it is a dance based romance flick. STR's moves will make the dance numbers shine even more on screen while his Appan Mavanae song is one of a kind for sure. The album's breezy songs are also impressive. Dharan is bound to get a good break with Podaa Podi." Milliblog reviewed "Barring incredibly excessive auto-tuning, Poda Podi is a pretty neat effort." Indiaglitz gave the album 3.5 out of 5 stating "Simbu, more recently called STR has had the privilege of having great scores of music is his film for quite some time. His history continues with Podaa Podi as music director Dharan Kumar has no intention of letting the run come to an end. Filled with interesting tracks, they are sure to make you wonder on first listen. The album has a lot to give the audience and might work wonders on screen if used well." Moviecrow gave the album a rating of 7 out of 10 Though it may sound like a usual Simbhu style album, the simple lyrics mounted on fresh sounds with medley of instruments make it a different experience. Dharan has done a great job delivering a distinct collection of rap, melody, rock & roll, kuthu and more. The songs have good scope for dance moves and picturization. Poda Podi is a treat for STR fans."

References

External links
 

Tamil film soundtracks
2012 soundtrack albums
2010s film soundtrack albums